Ashley Eicher is a host, producer, podcaster and storyteller. She is the host of Guest List Radio with Ashley Eicher on Apple Music. She is the co-host and co-founder of the All Our Favorite People Podcast with Ashley Eicher and Hunter Kelly. Conversations from the podcast have been featured on People.com, Billboard.com, ET Canada, CMT.com, PopCulture.com, CMA Close Up, Nashville Lifestyles and more.

Career 
She has been a host and correspondent for multiple television and digital media properties including USA Network, RollingStone.com, CMT, ABC.com, AXS TV, CMA and Vevo. A sought-after spokesperson and moderator for live events, her corporate clients include Marriott International, FlyteVu, Rodan + Fields, Drybar, and more. 

Under her production company AE Entertainment, Ashley develops and produces a wide variety of story-driven video content for companies like UMG Nashville, ACM Lifting Lives, Pilgrimage Music Festival, and more. She is also the host of a monthly video series on generosity and giving back called The Dollar Club with Cross Point Church in Nashville.

With an extensive background in the music business, she began her career working in Artist Management for Wynonna Judd and as a Music Agent Trainee working in both Los Angeles and Nashville for Creative Artists Agency.

Ashley also made a guest appearance as herself in Season 2 of ABC's hit drama Nashville.

A former Miss Tennessee, she won the non-finalist talent award when she competed at Miss America, was awarded a Gracie Allen Award from the American Women in Radio & Television for "Outstanding Achievement as a Program Host" and chosen as one of Nashville's "25 Most Beautiful People" by Nashville Lifestyles magazine.

References

 https://web.archive.org/web/20120327174916/http://www.thegracies.org/pdfs/2007_Gracies_Winners.pdf
 https://www.youtube.com/watch?v=o6bFHYko7Bc
 https://www.lukebryan.com/news.html?n_id=411
 https://web.archive.org/web/20130904204413/http://www.axs.tv/blogs/go-country-this-labor-day-with-axs-tvs-country-concert-marathon/
 http://www.axs.tv/press_articles/dierks-bentley-darius-rucker-dwight-yoakam-the-little-willies-and-jeff-bridges-the-abiders-headline-axs-tvs-stagecoach-broadcast/

External links
Ashley Eicher official website

Middle Tennessee State University alumni
Miss America 2005 delegates
Miss Tennessee winners
American television personalities
American women television personalities
Year of birth missing (living people)
Living people
Eastern High School (Louisville, Kentucky) alumni
American women podcasters
American podcasters